Kinnula is a municipality of Finland.

It is located in the Central Finland region.

Neighbouring municipalities are Kivijärvi, Lestijärvi, Perho, Pihtipudas, Reisjärvi and Viitasaari.

The municipality is unilingually Finnish.

Nature
There are all together 66 lakes in Kinnula. Biggest lakes are Kivijärvi, Yläjäppä Alajäppä and Iso-Koirajärvi. Salamajärvi National Park is partly located in Kinnula.

Politics
Results of the 2011 Finnish parliamentary election in Kinnula:

Centre Party   53.2%
National Coalition Party   14.7%
Social Democratic Party   13.1%
The Finns   12.0%
Left Alliance   3.7%
Christian Democrats   1.7%
Green League   0.9%

Twinnings
 Konguta Parish, Estonia
 Trøgstad, Norway

See also
 Finnish national road 58

References

External links

Municipality of Kinnula – Official website 

 
Municipalities of Central Finland